The Court of Appeal of Paris is the largest appeals court in France in terms of the number of cases brought before it. Its jurisdiction covers the departments of Paris, Essonne, Yonne, Seine-et-Marne, Seine-Saint-Denis, and the Val de Marne.

The Court is housed in the Palais de Justice of Paris. Jacques Degrandi has been the president of the Court since 2010.

See also
Court of Cassation (France)
Judiciary of France

References

External links
  

Courts and tribunals with year of establishment missing
Courts in France
Organizations based in Paris
Legal entities